Stapelianthus is a genus of flowering plants in the family Apocynaceae, first described as a genus in 1933. The entire genus is endemic to Madagascar and is concentrated in the far south of the island.

The genus is defined by the unique corona structure of its flowers.

Species
Species accepted by the Plants of the World Online as of January 2023 

formerly included
 Stapelianthus baylissii, syn of  Tridentea baylissii  
 Stapelianthus choananthus, syn of  Tridentea choanantha

Taxonomy
The species are extremely close to each other genetically, however the genus overall is very divergent from its relatives on the mainland.

Phylogenetic studies have shown the genus to be most closely related to a large and widespread branch of stapeliads from mainland Africa, comprising the genera Huernia, Tavaresia and a mixed sub-branch including Orbea, Piaranthus and Stapelia.

References

Apocynaceae genera
Endemic flora of Madagascar
Asclepiadoideae